The 2022 season for  is its 13th season overall and its sixth season as a UCI WorldTeam. It is also the sixth season under the current name. They use Specialized bicycles, Shimano drivetrain, Roval wheels and Sportful clothing.

Team roster 

Riders who joined the team for the 2022 season

Riders who left the team during or after the 2021 season

Season victories

National, Continental, and World Champions

Notes

References

External links 

 

Bora-Hansgrohe
2022
Bora-Hansgrohe